The Hon.George Gore (25 February 1774 – 27 August 1844) was an Anglican priest  in Ireland during the late 18th century.

Gore was the son of Arthur Gore, 2nd Earl of Arran and his second wife Anne Knight. He was educated at Trinity College, Dublin. He was Dean of Killala from 1817 until his death.

Notes

Alumni of Trinity College Dublin
18th-century Irish Anglican priests
Deans of Killala
1844 deaths
1774 births